DJ Drew G (born Andrew Gilbert Montalvo) is an American-born DJ and music producer in Houston. He is a reporter for DJ Times Magazine and Billboard Magazine.

Career 
From a young age, Drew had an interest in music. During his adolescence, he learned to play guitar and performed with various metal bands. By the age of 18, he had already released five albums and produced several others for local bands. By 2000, Drew was drawn to the New York City house music scene. Inspired by the DJ masters he experienced, he began to mix his own tracks featuring house music and his own guitar work. He began his career as a DJ playing smaller venues in New York City. He then began traveling to clubs in other cities, such as Washington, DC and Los Angeles, CA. Drew G has played New York City's famous Black Party (as the youngest DJ ever to play the event), numerous Cherry weekend events in Washington, DC, a 2008 Presidential Inaugural ball for President Barack Obama, Carnival in Puerto Vallarta, Mexico, Ski Weeks in Aspen, Colorado, Mammoth Lakes [Elevation], the Pink Party in Denver, CO, Mardi Gras in Sydney, Australia, Dunes Resort events in Saugatuck, Michigan, Ascension weekend at Fire Island Pines, and Sand Blast in Asbury Park, New Jersey.

In 2022 Madonna announced the release of "Finally Enough Love: 50 #1s" a collection of her 50 #1 Billboard Dance singles and Dirty Pop's remix of "Ghostown" was chosen to represent that single on this collection.

Drew has produced official remixes (either solo or with remix partner Brian Cua) for some very successful music artists, including Madonna, Beyoncé, LeAnn Rimes, Blondie, Ed Sheeran, and RuPaul,  among others.

Dirty Pop 
Dirty Pop is best known as the name of the remixing duo of Drew G. and fellow producer Brian Cua. 2014 and 2015 were particular banner years for Dirty Pop's production work. During that time, both Beyoncé ("Blow," "Pretty Hurts," "7/11") and Madonna ("Living For Love," "Ghosttown," "Bitch, I'm Madonna")  selected Drew and Brian to be official remixers of their singles.

The duo continues to produce remixes and original tracks. Their two original tracks, "Gag," "Light Up the Night," and their remake of "Nothing's Gonna Stop Us Now," have all charted on the Billboard Dance Club Play Chart.

The Dirty Pop brand also encompasses the traveling dance party in the U.S.

Remixes

As DrewG. 
DrewG. Official Commercially Released Remixes
 2017 "Fun" - Blondie
 2017 "Rose All Day" - Bobby Newberry
 2017 "Long Live Love" - LeAnn Rimes
 2017 "Love Is Love Is Love" - LeAnn Rimes
 2017 "Hard Times" - Randy Jones
 2017 "Running Back to You" - Bright Light Bright Light
 2017 "Mob Luxuries" - Uche
 2017 "Don't You Hide (l.i.b) - Ivana Lola
 2017 "Lost Love" - Lisa Cole
 2017 "Unity" - Knife N Fork N Leo Frappier ft. Bebe Sweetbriar
 2016 "Cryptic Love" - The Trash Mermaids
 2016 "It Starts Raining" - Side FX and Kim Cameron
 2010 "Work it Out"  - Lovari
 2009 "Cover Girl" - Rupaul
DrewG. Official Promotion Only Remixes
 2017 "Castle On The Hill" - Ed Sheeran
 2017 "Heart Away From You" - DJ Pebbles

As Dirty Pop 
Dirty Pop Official Commercially Released Remixes
 2017 "Cocaine and Whiskey" - Jason Dottley
 2016 "Burning Up" - Karine Hannah & Dave Audé
 2016 "Girl From Ipanema" - Ana Paula ft. Deborah Cox
 2016 "We Can Make It" - Offer Nissim ft Dana International
 2016 "Purse First" - Bob the Drag Queen
 2016 "The Glittering Gutter" - Billie Ray Martin
 2016 "One Night In Heaven" - Toy Armada & DJ GRIND ft. Inaya Day
 2016 "World" - Gia
 2016 "My Heart Beats Faster" - Swishcraft ft Emoni Washington
 2016 "Imagine" - Sir Ivan
 2016 "I'll Sleep When I Die" - The Kissboyz
 2015 "Bitch I'm Madonna" - Madonna
 2015 "Living for Love" - Madonna
 2015 "Ghosttown" - Madonna
 2015 "Kaleidoscope" - Courtney Act
 2015 "Sacrifice" - John DeGrazio
 2015 "High Enough" - Alina Artts
 2015 "I Like You" - Tony Moran ft Debby Holiday
 2015 "Su-Su-Su Superstar" - Brian Kent
 2015 "Wimbledon" - Rich White Ladies
 2015 "Time to Move On" - Mary Wilson
 2015 "Same Love" - Tracy Young ft. Karina Iglesias
 2015 "I Just Go" - Aiden Leslie 
 2015 "Believe" - Chaos ft CeCe Peniston
 2015 "Bass In Me" - Chron
 2015 "Back To You" - Natasha Ashworth
 2014 "Burn" - DJ Shocker
 2014 "Werq" - Carmen Electra
 2014 "Speak No Evil" - Kimberly Davis
 2014 "It's Love To Me" - Matt Ryanz
 2012 "I'm Free" - Hayla
 2011 "Sweet Sugar Poison" - Dave Matthias and Julissa Veloz
 2011 "Coming Back" - Matt Consola ft. Brenda Reed
Dirty Pop Official Promotional Only Remixes
 2016 "Stronger Together" - Jessica Sanchez
 2014 "Pretty Hurts" - Beyoncé
 2014 "7/11" - Beyoncé
 2014 "Blow" - Beyoncé
 2011 "Love On Top" - Beyoncé

Awards and recognition 
 2014 Best Unofficial Remixer – Dirrty Remixes
 2013 "Dancing Queen" aka Best DJ Weho Confidential
 2013 Coors Light Coldest DJ (LA) GayCities
 2012 Out Magazine Top 10 DJs
 2012 Best Las Vegas DJ, Sin City Times
 2011 People Choice Award DJ – Tom Whitman Presents (LA)

References

1983 births
Living people
Musicians from New York City
American dance musicians